Milieudefensie (Dutch for "environmental defense") is a Dutch environmental organisation, founded on 6 January 1971, by a group of scientists in response to a report by the Club of Rome. It  performs research and brings out its own reports (sometimes requested by the government) but has also developed into an action group, often operating together with other organisations, such as the political party GreenLeft, and is the Dutch branch of Friends of the Earth.
Milieudefensie is part of the 30 national organisations that Friends of the Earth Europe represents and unites at the European level.

Milieudefensie has approximately 90,000 members and focuses on five main themes:
Globalisation
Transportation
Climate and energy
Landscape
Agriculture and food

Climate change: "Not with my money"

In recent years, climate change has become a major issue. For example, in 2006 and 2007, Milieudefensie started a campaign called "" ("Not with my money") to stimulate public awareness about the role of banks in climate change. Together, Dutch banks manage a total of 2,700 billion euro, by which they have a huge influence on which projects can go through and which cannot. According to Milieudefensie, the four major Dutch banks cause CO2 emissions that are three times that of the Netherlands through their investments. They listed the ABN Amro bank as being the "worst", followed by the ING bank and Fortis. According to Milieudefensie, the "best" banks in terms of CO2 emissions would be ASN and Triodos.

Bulderbos
Milieudefensie also uses legal methods, such as suing companies and the government. Possibly the most eye-catching action of Milieudefensie was one designed to stop the construction of a fifth runway at Schiphol airport. For this, they bought part of the land on which it was to be constructed and then sold small pieces of that land to many individuals. As a result, all those people had to disown the land separately. On this terrain, a forest was planted, the Bulderbos ("thunder forest").

See also 
Milieudefensie et al v Royal Dutch Shell

References

External links
Official website
Investing in Climate Change, a report on the climate-(un)friendliness of banks (in English)
Friends of the Earth International Website
Friends of the Earth Europe Website

Activism
Friends of the Earth
Climate change organizations
Environmental organisations based in the Netherlands
Organizations established in 1971
1971 establishments in the Netherlands